Susan Marjory Brown (born 12 December 1958) is a Scottish Presbyterian minister. She is the minister at Dornoch Cathedral and Honorary Chaplain to the Queen in Scotland. She was the first woman to take charge of a cathedral in the United Kingdom.

Early life and education
Brown was born on 12 December 1958 in Edinburgh, Scotland. She was educated at Penicuik High School, a non-denominational school in Midlothian. She went on to study at the University of Edinburgh, graduating with a Bachelor of Divinity (BD) degree in 1981 and completing a Diploma in Ministry (DipMin) in 1983.

Ministry
Brown served as an assistant minister at St Giles' Cathedral, Edinburgh from 1983 to 1985. Having been ordained in 1985, she served as minister of Killearnan Parish Church near Muir of Ord in Ross-Shire from 1985 to 1998. Since 1998, she has been minister of Dornoch Cathedral in Sutherland. She officiated at the wedding of Madonna and Guy Ritchie in 2000. She has additionally served as Chaplain-in-Ordinary to Queen Elizabeth II since 2010.

On 9 October 2017, it was announced that she had been nominated as the next Moderator of the General Assembly of the Church of Scotland. She took up the position in May 2018 and served until May 2019.

Personal life
In 1981, Susan Attwell married Derek Brown, a fellow minister and hospital chaplain. Together they have two children: one daughter and one son.

See also
List of Moderators of the General Assembly of the Church of Scotland

References

20th-century Ministers of the Church of Scotland
Living people
1958 births
Moderators of the General Assembly of the Church of Scotland
People educated at Penicuik High School
21st-century Ministers of the Church of Scotland
Chaplains-in-Ordinary
Alumni of the University of Edinburgh